Yee Sar Ta Won Kwal is a 2018 Burmese romantic-comedy film, directed by Ko Zaw (Ar Yone Oo) starring Sai Sai Kham Leng, Phway Phway and Mya Hnin Yee Lwin. The film, produced by Frenzo Production and Heart & Soul Film Production premiered in Myanmar on December 21, 2018.

Cast
Sai Sai Kham Leng as Khant Htal Wah
Phway Phway as Ei Tone, Thel Myintzu Phu Ngone Lin Let
Mya Hnin Yee Lwin as Annie

References

External links

2018 films
2010s Burmese-language films
Burmese romantic comedy films
Films shot in Myanmar
2018 romantic comedy films